The Bezirk Landeck is an administrative district (Bezirk) in Tyrol, Austria. It borders the district Reutte in the north, the district Imst in the east, South Tyrol (Italy) and Graubünden (Switzerland) in the south, and the district Bludenz (Vorarlberg) in the west.

The area of the district is 1,595 km². The population is 43,886 (January 1, 2015), with a population density of 28 persons per km². The administrative center is Landeck.

Geography 
The district comprises the uppermost part of the Inn valley and its tributary valleys Kaunertal, Stanzer Tal, and Paznaun. Mountain ranges in the district include parts of the Ötztal Alps, the Samnaun Alps, parts of the Verwall Alps and the Lechtal Alps, and the Arlberg area.

Administrative divisions 
The district is divided into 30 municipalities, one of which is a city.

City 
 Landeck (7,742)

Municipalities 
 Faggen (371)
 Fendels (270)
 Fiss (978)
 Fließ (2,921)
 Flirsch (939)
 Galtür (826)
 Grins (1,386)
 Ischgl (1,596)
 Kappl (2,625)
 Kaunerberg (402)
 Kaunertal (630)
 Kauns (472)
 Ladis (533)
 Nauders (1,558)
 Pettneu am Arlberg (1,459)
 Pfunds (2,544)
 Pians (800)
 Prutz (1,735)
 Ried im Oberinntal (1,264)
 Sankt Anton am Arlberg (2,564)
 Schönwies (1,712)
 See (1,164)
 Serfaus (1,081)
 Spiss (134)
 Stanz bei Landeck (590)
 Strengen (1,208)
 Tobadill (497)
 Tösens (669)
 Zams (3,273)

(population numbers as of January 1, 2012) 

 
Districts of Tyrol (state)